Denis Wiehe C.S.Sp. (born 21 May 1940 Curepipe, Mauritius) is the former Bishop of the Roman Catholic Diocese of Port Victoria, Seychelles, where he is now bishop emeritus. He succeeded Bishop Xavier-Marie Baronnet in 2002.

Wiehe was ordained a Catholic priest within the Holy Ghost Fathers on 17 August 1969. He was first appointed a coadjutor bishop of the Diocese of Port Victoria on 24 April 2001. On 1 June 2002 Wiehe was elevated to Bishop of the Port Victoria, succeeding Bishop Baronnet, who retired.

On 10 September 2020, his resignation was accepted by Pope Francis, while Bishop Alain Harel, the Vicar Apostolic of Rodrigues in Mauritius, was appointed as his successor.

See also
Roman Catholicism in Seychelles

References

External links

1940 births
21st-century Roman Catholic bishops in the Seychelles
Seychellois Roman Catholic bishops
Holy Ghost Fathers
Living people
Roman Catholic bishops of Port Victoria